Jeanne Moos (born May 21) is an American national news correspondent for CNN. She is based at the network's studios in Manhattan.

Biography
A native of Pittsburgh, Pennsylvania, Moos originally wanted to pursue a career in print journalism, but while attending the S.I. Newhouse School of Public Communications at Syracuse University (where she earned a bachelor's degree in TV-Radio), she decided to go into the television business instead. In 1976, she landed her first major job in television at WPTZ in Plattsburgh, New York, as the station's first female correspondent. During her tenure at WPTZ, she covered local and national stories, including the 1980 Winter Olympics in Lake Placid, New York.

In 1981, she joined CNN as a reporter. It was there that she covered stories ranging from political corruption to the United Nations during the 1991 Gulf War.

In the 1990s, Moos began to report on unusual and off-beat soft news stories, which is her current trademark. In 1995, she began a series of reports called "Making The MOOSt Of It". Today Moos continues to file reports for CNN in a segment called "Moost Unusual", seen during The Situation Room and during Showbiz Tonight on CNN Headline News. These stories tend to focus on subjects related to popular culture and make use of man-on-the-street style interviews, shots of tabloid magazine headlines, and clips garnered from videos on YouTube. They also frequently take viewers behind the scenes, showing Moos placing prank calls from her office or cracking jokes with other employees in CNN's Manhattan studios.

Controversy 
In April 2014, Moos apologized following CNN's airing of a segment titled "Man in thong: Eyes up here, Duchess!", which was deemed "insensitive" and "racist" by viewers.  In the roughly two-minute video, Moos mocked New Zealand Maori culture including traditional dance, costume, a greeting ceremony, and the haka, which she described as "a cross between a Chippendales lap dance and the mating dance of an emu".

See also
 Cable news in the United States
 New Yorkers in journalism

References

American television reporters and correspondents
American humorists
S.I. Newhouse School of Public Communications alumni
Journalists from New York City
Journalists from Pennsylvania
Television personalities from Pittsburgh
Living people
CNN people
American women television journalists
Women humorists
20th-century American journalists
21st-century American journalists
20th-century American women
21st-century American women
Year of birth missing (living people)